Hajji Sara (also Romanized as Ḩājjī Sarā) is a village in Moridan Rural District, Kumeleh District, Langarud County, Gilan Province, Iran. At the 2006 census, its population was 902, in 271 families.

References 

Populated places in Langarud County